Bain Hill is a summit in St. Francois County, Missouri. The hill rises to the east of and about 200 feet above the Little St. Francis River. Knob Lick lies about four miles to the west and Mine La Motte is about five miles to the south in Madison County.

Bain Hill has the name of Peter Bains, the original owner of the site.

References

Mountains of St. Francois County, Missouri
Mountains of Missouri